Mackay Estate Water Tower is a historic water tower located in the Incorporated Village of East Hills in Nassau County, on Long Island, in New York, United States. The tower was originally a component of Clarence Mackay's Harbor Hill Estate.

Description 
The tower is a utilitarian structure manufactured by the Phillipsburg, New Jersey-baed firm of Tippett and Wood. The tank is round in plan and topped by a bell-shaped slate roof and copper cupola. The tank stands on eight legs, each of which is 34 feet tall.

Originally a component of Clarence Mackay's Harbor Hill Estate, the water tower and tank are concealed inside a tall structure designed by Stanford White that is constructed of stone, laid in random ashlar, and the roof is spanned by a Guastavino tile dome.

It was listed on the National Register of Historic Places in 1991.  It is one of three remaining buildings listed at that time; the others are the Mackay Estate Dairyman's Cottage and Mackay Estate Gate Lodge.

References

Water towers in the United States
Water towers on the National Register of Historic Places
Buildings and structures on the National Register of Historic Places in New York (state)
Infrastructure completed in 1902
Towers completed in 1902
Buildings and structures in Nassau County, New York
National Register of Historic Places in Nassau County, New York
1902 establishments in New York (state)